Darreh Hadavand (also Romanized as Darreh Ḩadāvand and Darreh-ye Ḩadāvand) is a village in Zhan Rural District, in the Central District of Dorud County, Lorestan Province, Iran. At the 2006 census, its population was 24, in 5 families.

References 

Towns and villages in Dorud County